Sarcos Technology and Robotics Corporation (NASDAQ: STRC) is an American developer of robotics and microelectromechanical systems and related technologies. It was founded in the early 1980s when it was spun out from the University of Utah. The company specializes in creating robotic systems for military and industrial applications. Sarcos' work can be found in a wide variety of applications, ranging from the robotic pirates and dinosaurs at theme parks to the robotic fountains in front of the Bellagio in Hotel in Las Vegas, to NASA space suit testing equipment, prosthetic limbs, and MEMS sensors. Time Magazine named Sarcos’ Guardian XO full-body, powered exoskeleton one of “The 100 Best Inventions of 2020”.

The company is developing robots that improve safety and efficiency in a variety of industries such as defense, public safety, manufacturing, logistics, oil & gas, construction, transportation, mining, infrastructure inspection and health care. In September 2021, Sarcos Corp. merged with Rotor Acquisition Corp., a publicly traded special purpose acquisition company (SPAC) that was renamed Sarcos Technology and Robotics Corporation.

In April 2022, Sarcos acquired Pittsburgh-based robotics company, RE2, Inc. RE2 has developed autonomous and tele-operated mobile robots for use in aviation, construction, defense, energy, subsea, and medical industries, which will continue to be offered through Sarcos.

History 
Sarcos was founded in 1983 by Stephen Jacobsen and operated principally as a bioengineering research institution. By 1992, Jacobsen increased attention to commercial interests such as animated film props, prostheses, and human/computer interfaces. In 2000, Sarcos accepted a grant from DARPA, the research arm of the United States Department of Defense, to develop a design for a powered exoskeleton suitable for military applications. DARPA accepted the Sarcos design in 2006 and the firm began developing prototypes. In November 2007, Raytheon purchased Sarcos for an undisclosed sum, seeking to expand into robotics research and production.

In 2006, Sarcos attracted media attention for developing an exoskeleton that is designed to be worn by a human, that was at the time slated for production in 2008 for the United States Army.

From 2007 until 2014, Sarcos operated as the robotics division of American defense contractor Raytheon and was known as Raytheon Sarcos. During this period, Raytheon Sarcos was focused exclusively on developing technologies for use by U.S. governmental agencies.

The company was a division of Raytheon until 2015 when Raytheon Sarcos President and Mission Center Executive Dr. Fraser Smith and technology entrepreneur Ben Wolff led a consortium that acquired the business from Raytheon. In September 2016, Cottonwood Technology Fund, Caterpillar, GE Ventures and Microsoft led a financing round to provide Sarcos with growth capital to commercialize its products. A number of additional investors have also provided funding, including Schlumberger, Rotor Capital, Alex. Brown, DIG Investment and others. Sarcos was listed on NASDAQ in September 2021.

Sarcos has developed technologies in partnership with, and for, government agencies such as DARPA, NASA, the Department of Homeland Security, Fortune 100 companies such as AT&T, Boeing, Ford, Merck, and Xerox PARC, and universities such as MIT and Carnegie Mellon. With more than a million invested in the development of its technologies and over 140 patents related to its core products, Sarcos’ technologies represent decades of advancements in complex electro-mechanical and biologically inspired engineered systems. Sarcos has been one of the top recipients of DARPA funding over the years.

Products
Sarcos Technology and Robotics Corporation is developing and commercializing its Guardian series of robots, as well as the Sapien line of robot arms from RE2, which includes models with capabilities ranging from precision arms for surgical applications to rugged outdoor arms for construction tasks, as well as the Sapien Sea Class system, which can operate in shallow and deep water.

Guardian S - Portable surveillance and inspection robot 
The Sarcos Guardian S robot was designed for portable surveillance and inspection. The Guardian S can be tele-operated from miles away, can traverse stairs, culverts, pipes, tanks, and vertical ferromagnetic surfaces, and includes two-way real-time video, voice and data communication. It aims to improve safety and efficiency for workers and is optimized to operate in confined spaces and dangerous environments. It is designed for use across a variety of industries, such as public safety, disaster recovery, infrastructure inspection, aerospace, maritime, oil and gas and mining.

Guardian GT - Force-multiplying dexterous robot 
The Sarcos Guardian GT dexterous industrial robot is mounted on a vehicle base and can lift up to 1,000 pounds with arms that precisely follow an operator's motions. It can be tele-operated to keep humans safe while performing dangerous tasks, such as dismantling nuclear power plants. The product is sold on a made-to-order basis and was designed for industries such as manufacturing, construction, logistics, transportation and power generation.

Guardian XO – Exoskeleton robot 
The Sarcos Guardian XO is a full-body powered exoskeleton, designed for a variety of industrial and military applications, which is currently under development and is said to become commercially available in 2022. The Guardian XO is powered by standard lithium ion batteries and is designed to increase strength and endurance while helping to prevent injury. The Guardian XO enables workers to lift up to 200 pounds repeatedly without strain or fatigue.

Guardian XT – Dexterous tele-operated robot 
The Sarcos Guardian XT dexterous tele-operated robot was introduced in 2020 and is based on the upper-body of the Guardian XO exoskeleton. It has been adapted to attach to a variety of mobile bases, such as wheeled or tracked vehicles that can operate at height. The Guardian XT can operate on boom lifts, scissor lifts, and bucket trucks, which can address a variety of maintenance and logistics needs while keeping a worker safe while performing dangerous work. Sarcos is also developing a defense version, the Guardian DX, and announced a contract with the U.S. Navy for its development.

Sapien Arms 
The Sapien family of robotic arms was unveiled in April 2021. These robotic arms are meant to provide human-like capabilities beyond traditional industrial arms and collaborative robots.

Sapien Sea Class 
The Sapien Sea Class is a single- or dual-armed system designed for subsea use. The arms each offer six degrees of freedom for “human-like dexterity” and can operate at a depth of 300 meters, or deeper if adapted.

Product development history
Since its inception in 1983, Sarcos has produced a wide variety of robotic devices for different applications. It built undersea salvage robots for the United States Navy and other units for law enforcement organizations. Sarcos also builds robotic props for films and amusement park attractions. For example, Sarcos has built some of the animated pirates seen in the Pirates of the Caribbean attraction appearing at four Disney theme parks, the Wicked Witch of the West audio-animatronic at Disney's Hollywood Studios' The Great Movie Ride, the robotic dinosaurs for Jurassic Park: The Ride at Universal Studios Hollywood, and the robotic fountains for the Bellagio casino in Las Vegas.

References

External links 
 Sarcos web site

Health care companies based in Utah
Manufacturing companies based in Salt Lake City
Robotics companies of the United States
Medical technology companies of the United States
American companies established in 1983
Health care companies established in 1983
Raytheon Company
1983 establishments in Utah
Companies formed by management buyout
Companies listed on the Nasdaq